Navara rice is one of the many types of rice found in India,  and is a unique grain plant in the Oryza group.  It originated somewhere in Kerala, where it is regarded as endemic.  In 2007–09, geographical indication status was granted.  (Typically, such classification indicates an assurance of quality and distinctiveness which is primarily derived from a defined geographical region.)  

There seems to have been about a hundred varieties of rice but only about 20 types are said to be existing.  Navara is one of the 20. 

The rice is often powdered and then mixed with milk and taken in the form of a cereal.

Navara also has religious significance and is sometimes used in temples for ceremonies.

See also
Mysore betel leaf
Nanjanagud banana
Byadagi chilli

References
Balachandran, P V. Navara, the rice that cures. Down to Earth. 31 May 2008. carrington

External links
 Potential and Prospects of Medicinal Rice with Special Reference to Navara - see page 287 
 Navara Eco Farm
 Video on Medicinal Rice of Kerala -Njavara/Navara
 Health and Curative Benefits of Navara Rice
 Recipe to cook Payasam using Navara rice
 Puttu recipe using Navara rice

Rice varieties
Agriculture in Kerala
Geographical indications in Kerala